An Túr Gloine (Irish for "The Glass Tower") was a cooperative studio for stained glass and opus sectile artists from 1903 until 1944, based in Dublin, Ireland.

History
An Túr Gloine was conceived of in late 1901 and established January 1903 at 24 Pembroke Street, Dublin, Ireland, on the site of two former tennis courts. It was active throughout the first half of the 20th century. Affiliated artists included Michael Healy, Evie Hone, Beatrice Elvery, Wilhelmina Geddes, Catherine O'Brien, Kathleen Quigly, and founder Sarah Purser. The original impetus for the project, spurred by the Irish cultural activist Edward Martyn, was the building of the Roman Catholic cathedral in Loughrea, County Galway, which was to become St. Brendan's. Purser and Martyn hoped to provide an alternative to the commercial stained glass imported from England and Germany for Irish churches and other architectural projects. Purser's knowledge of French and English medieval glass, together with her social connections and organizational skills, were crucial to the success of the cooperative.

A writer for The Studio, a magazine of fine and applied art, called the recently formed An Túr Gloine "perhaps the most noteworthy example of the newly awakened desire to foster Irish genius," describing it as "at once a craft school, where instruction in every detail connected with the designing and production of stained glass is given to the workers, and a factory from which some beautiful work has already appeared." The writer also extolled the economic benefits of an Irish glass industry to supply churches. The studio is regarded as part of the Arts and Crafts Movement, but was infused also with the contemporary spirit of Irish revivalism and drew on the artistic tradition of Celtic manuscript illumination. Ireland became an internationally renowned center of stained-glass art at this time, to a large extent as a result of An Túr Gloine. The studio was run by Purser until 1940, and she was succeeded by Catherine O'Brien who ran it until 1944. After which time O'Brien bought the studio and leased a large section of it to Patrick Pollen.

Relation to literary culture
A commission for An Túr Gloine occasioned an outburst of criticism in Samhain magazine from the Irish poet W.B. Yeats on how the "bourgeois mind is never sincere in the arts":

Works
The following table provides examples of work commissioned from the studio or created by individual artists associated with An Túr Gloine.

References

Sources

 

Irish stained glass artists and manufacturers
Glassmaking companies of Ireland
Defunct glassmaking companies
Defunct companies of Ireland
Manufacturing companies based in Dublin (city)
Manufacturing companies established in 1903
Manufacturing companies disestablished in 1944
1903 establishments in Ireland
1944 disestablishments in Ireland
Design companies established in 1903
Design companies disestablished in 1944